Bohdan "Bugsy" Nyskohus OAM (born 28 June 1950) is an Australian former soccer player who played as a defender. He began his career with South Australian team USC Lion before playing 13 years in the National Soccer League (NSL) for Adelaide City. He is the older brother of fellow Australia national soccer team player John Nyskohus and USC Lion player Peter Nyskohus.

Club career
Nyskohus was born in Woodside, South Australia. He began his senior football career with Ukrainian Sports Club Lion in the South Australian State League.

He later played for and captained Adelaide City in the Australian National Soccer League (NSL) between 1977 and 1989.

Nyskohus played in all of the first 13 seasons of the NSL, becoming the first person to play 300 NSL games.

State representative career
Nyskohus holds the record for the most appearances for the South Australia state team, playing 66 times.

International career
Nyskohus played three full international matches for Australia, making his debut against New Zealand in a friendly in Jakarta. He also played in two B-international matches for Australia against a touring Wolverhampton Wanderers team.

References

Living people
1950 births
Australian soccer players
Association football defenders
Australia international soccer players
National Soccer League (Australia) players
Adelaide City FC players